The Russian Federation is a multinational state with over 190 ethnic groups designated as nationalities, population of these groups varying enormously, from millions in case of e.g. Russians and Tatars to under ten thousand in the case of Samis and Kets.  Among 85 subjects which constitute the Russian Federation, there are 21 national republics (meant to be home to a specific ethnic minority), 5 autonomous okrugs (usually with substantial or predominant ethnic minority) and an autonomous oblast.

The table below gives the population of various ethnic groups of Russia according to the 2002 Russian Census.

A

B

V

G

D

E

Y

Z

I

Y

K

L

M

N

O

P

R

S

T

U

F

Kh

Ts

C

Sh

E

Y

Miscellaneous

Merged table
Since the number of ethnic groups recorded was too high the table was modified merging similar ethnic groups. The below table was prepared after merging similar groups.

See also 
 Ethnic groups in Russia
 Demographics of Russia
 Ethnic groups of Siberia
 First All Union Census of the Soviet Union

References

Russia
Ethnic